Once Again was the second album released by Barclay James Harvest, in early 1971. As was the case with their other early albums, it was recorded with a full orchestra.

On the track "Galadriel", Lees played John Lennon's Epiphone Casino guitar, an event later recounted in a song on the band's 1990 album Welcome To The Show titled "John Lennon's Guitar".

In an interview with Songfacts, Keith Domone (official biographer of Barclay James Harvest with his wife Monika) said John Lees wrote "Mocking Bird" back in 1968 while he was living with the parents of his future wife, Olwen. The song is based on a musical phrase from "Pools Of Blue", which he wrote around the same time.

In the Q & Mojo Classic Special Edition ‘’Pink Floyd & The Story of Prog Rock’’, the album came #39 in its list of "40 Cosmic Rock Albums".

Track listing
The credits on the original liner notes are incorrect, titles being attributed to the band as a whole. The credits shown here are the actual composers.

Side one
"She Said" (Barclay James Harvest) – 8:21
"Happy Old World" (Woolly Wolstenholme) – 4:40
"Song for Dying" (John Lees) – 5:02
"Galadriel" (John Lees) – 3:14

Side two
"Mocking Bird" (Lees) – 6:39
"Vanessa Simmons" (Lees) – 3:45
"Ball And Chain" (Wolstenholme) – 4:49
"Lady Loves" (Lees) – 4:07

Bonus tracks
Once Again was remastered and reissued by Harvest in 2002 with five bonus tracks: 2 outtakes and 3 from the 1973 quadrophonic mix of the album.
"Introduction - White Sails (A Seascape)" (Wolstenholme) – 1:43 arranged by Robert Godfrey
"Too Much On Your Plate" (Lees, Holroyd, Wolstenholme, Mel Pritchard) – 5:28
"Happy Old World" (Wolstenholme) – 4:40 Quadrophonic mix
"Vanessa Simmons" (Lees) – 3:46 Quadrophonic mix
"Ball And Chain" (Wolstenholme) – 4:48 Quadrophonic mix

Personnel
Barclay James Harvest
John Lees – vocals, guitars, recorder
Les Holroyd – vocals, bass, guitars, keyboards
Stuart "Woolly" Wolstenholme – vocals, mellotron, keyboards
Mel Pritchard – drums, percussion

Additional personnel

The Barclay James Harvest Symphony Orchestra
Orchestra Leader: Gavyn Wright
Conductor and Musical Director: Robert John Godfrey
Alan Parsons – jaw harp on "Lady Loves"
Engineer: Peter Bown

References

1971 albums
Barclay James Harvest albums
Albums produced by Norman Smith (record producer)
Harvest Records albums
Sire Records albums